Horwich is a civil parish in the Metropolitan Borough of Bolton, Greater Manchester, England.  It contains 19 listed buildings that are recorded in the National Heritage List for England.  All the listed buildings are designated at Grade II, the lowest of the three grades, which is applied to "buildings of national importance and special interest".  The parish contains the town of Horwich and the surrounding countryside.  It has an industrial heritage, including a bleach works, and a locomotive factory.  The listed buildings include buildings surviving from the bleach works, a war memorial associated with the locomotive factory, houses and farmhouses, churches, a public house, a parish hall, a school, and a set of stocks.


Buildings

Notes and references

Notes

Citations

Sources

Lists of listed buildings in Greater Manchester
Buildings and structures in the Metropolitan Borough of Bolton
Listed buildings